La Goulette, in Arabic Halq al-Wadi, is a municipality and the port of Tunis, Tunisia. 

The port, located 12km east of Tunis, is the point of convergence of Tunisia's major road and rail networks. La Goulette is linked to Tunis by the TGM railway and to Europe by a ferry service.

Origin of the name 
The name derives from the "gullet" or "river's throat", a channel where the city is located, and not from the ship type schooner, called goélette, gulet, goleta or goletta in French, Turkish, Spanish and Italian.

Transit activities 
In addition to its transit and cruise activities, the port of La Goulette also receives ships carrying cargoes such as cars, bulk cereals. It handles a large portion of the country's imports and much of its exports (principally phosphates, iron ore, and fruits and vegetables).

However, the development plan of the port provides for its specialization as a port exclusively reserved for passenger and tourist traffic.

History 
The kasbah fortress was built in 1535 by Charles I of Spain, but was captured by the Ottoman Turks in 1574. The remains of Hispano-Turkish fortifications lie inland.

The port was a popular destination for summer holidays in the 19th century, known as 'la petite Sicile'. It was also home to a sizeable Jewish, Italian, and Maltese community.

See also
 European enclaves in North Africa before 1830
 Tunisian navy (1705-1881)
 Luis Fajardo, attacked this place in 1609
 Tunisian Italians

References

External links 
 
 1996 film inspired by pre-1967 religious diversity in area

Communes of Tunisia
Goulette
Populated places in Tunisia
Ports and harbours of the Arab League
Transport in the Arab League
Goulette